Cheatham Hill is a summit in the U.S. state of Georgia.

Cheatham Hill was named after Benjamin F. Cheatham, a general in the Confederate States Army during the American Civil War. The hill was the scene of heavy fighting during the Battle of Kennesaw Mountain. The site is home to the Illinois Monument, which honors Union soldiers from Illinois.

References

Landforms of Cobb County, Georgia
Hills of Georgia (U.S. state)